Kinjil Mathur is an American business woman and the current chief marketing officer of Squarespace. She was in Vogues list of "49 incredible Indian women who are creating legacies across the globe".

References

American businesspeople
Living people
American people of Indian descent
Year of birth missing (living people)